Ricardo Bruno Antunes Machado Rio (born 21 November 1972) is a Portuguese economist and politician, currently serving as mayor of Braga.

A member of the Social Democratic Party (PSD), he became mayor in the 2013 local elections in coalition with the CDS – People's Party and People's Monarchist Party. Since the first democratic elections in 1976, the city had been presided over by Mesquita Machado of the Socialist Party, who did not run in 2013 due to term limits.

In April 2017, the PSD voted unanimously for him to be their mayoral candidate for the elections in October. One of his policies was to convert Braga into a smart city. He won a second term, with his right-wing coalition getting 53% of the votes.

Rio's coalition, now including the Alliance, won a third absolute majority in 2021. He called this victory one in a "very different scenario" due to the arrival of rival right-wing parties in Chega and the Liberal Initiative.

References

Mayors of places in Portugal
Social Democratic Party (Portugal) politicians
People from Braga
Living people
1972 births
University of Porto alumni